André Manuel Pinto Nogueira Sousa (born 16 July 1997) is a Portuguese footballer who plays for Pevidém as a midfielder.

Club career
On 25 October 2016, Sousa made his professional debut with Paços Ferreira in a 2016–17 Taça da Liga match against Nacional. He would feature in a total of three cup games and one league game for Paços de Ferreira.

References

External links

Stats and profile at LPFP 

1997 births
Living people
Footballers from Porto
Portuguese footballers
Association football midfielders
F.C. Paços de Ferreira players
Leça F.C. players
C.F. União players
Juventude de Pedras Salgadas players
Pevidém S.C. players
Primeira Liga players
Campeonato de Portugal (league) players